Mubuku I Power Station is a  mini-hydroelectric power station in Uganda.

Location
The power station is located between Bugoye and Kitoko, straddling the Mubuku River in Kasese District in Western Uganda. The station is in the foothills of the Rwenzori Mountains, close to the border with the Democratic Republic of the Congo.

History
Kilembe Mines Limited built the state in the 1950s to power the extraction of copper ore from the Rwenzori Mountains. The copper extraction ceased in the 1970s, and the power generated is now sold to the national grid. The Mubuku I Power Station is the third mini-hydropower station on the Mubuku River.

Overview
The station is a run-of-the-river mini-hydropower installation, with installed capacity of 5 megawatts. In September 2013, Ugandan print media indicated that the Tibet-Hima Consortium, the Chinese company that won the concession to run Kilembe Mines for the next twenty five years, has plans to increase capacity of the power plant to 12 megawatts.  The concession agreement was later terminated in September 2017 following reports of failure by Tibet-Hima to meet obligations stipulated in the agreement.

See also

List of power stations in Uganda
List of hydropower stations in Africa

References

External links
  Estimated Location of Mubuku I Power Station At Google Maps
 Kasese District Homepage

Hydroelectric power stations in Uganda
Kasese District
Western Region, Uganda